Cubismo is a Croatian music band of eleven members playing salsa and latin jazz. The band was formed in 1995 by a gathering of eight eminent musicians from various Croatian music bands. They also featured a Venezuelan vocalist Ricardo Luque.

Overview
The name Cubismo was created from Dizzy Gillespie's piece "Cu-bi Cu-bop", which represents one of the first music mixes of jazz and afro-Cuban music. The name is associated with Cuba as well, which has a music tradition known as the cornerstone of entire music genre made and performed by Cubismo.

Their sound is characterized by multiplicity of instruments and expressively strong dance rhythm produced by a multi-member rhythm section. Besides remakes of standard jazz pieces, popular and traditional Cuban songs, they perform their own pieces.

They are signed with the record label, Aquarius Records (Croatia).

Albums
 1997: Cubismo
 1998: Viva La Habana
 1999 Alegrate mi pueblo / Radujte se narodi
 2000: Motivo Cubano
 2002: Junglesalsa
 2004: Amigos
 2005: Amigos DVD Live in Lisinski
 2007 Autobus Calypso

References

External links
 Cubismo.com - the official site. 
 Cubismo discography at Discogs. 
 Cubismo Live @ Nisomnia 2004.
 https://www.facebook.com/cubismo
https://www.youtube.com/watch?v=cw-qzs9hTb4&list=PL2E4077EAF07FB9CF

Croatian musical groups
Salsa music groups
Hayat Production artists
Musical groups established in 1996
1996 establishments in Croatia
Indexi Award winners